Joanna White (born 3 March 1979) is a Canadian former cricketer. She played for Canada in the inaugural edition of the ICC Women's World Twenty20 Qualifier in 2013.

References 

1979 births
Living people
Canadian women cricketers